Majhergram  is a village located in Ranaghat II block in the  Nadia district in the state of West Bengal, India.

References 

Villages in North 24 Parganas district